Julsy Gitel Hermelin Boukama-Kaya (born 5 February 1993) is a Congolese professional footballer who plays for Angolan club C.R.D. Libolo and the Congo national team.

Honours 
Coton Sport
Winner
 Elite One: 2013

Runner-up
 Elite One: 2011–2012

C.R.D. Libolo
Winner
 Girabola: 2014

External links 
 
 

1993 births
Living people
Republic of the Congo footballers
Republic of the Congo international footballers
C.R.D. Libolo players
Association football midfielders